Josiel da Rocha (born August 7, 1980 in Rodeio Bonito, RS), or simply Josiel, is a Brazilian striker.

Career
He was the top scorer in the 2007 Brazilian Série A, with 20 goals, when played for the Paraná Clube. He possesses good dribbling and finishing ability. On August 19, 2008, he joined Brazilian Série A club Flamengo.

On March 25, 2009 Josiel scored his first hat trick playing for Flamengo in a 4-2 win against Madureira in the 2009 Rio de Janeiro State League. Three days later he scored another two goals, this time against Resende in a 4-0 win, for the same competition. He has played for Flamengo on loan from Al-Wahda and signed on 17 July 2009 a loan contract with Chiapas. He made his first appearance with Jaguares on August 1, 2009 in their 2-0 loss against Club Toluca.
He was released from his contract after serial indiscipline reports.

Career statistics
(Correct As of May 17, 2011)

according to combined sources on the.

Honours

Club
Flamengo
 Taça Rio: 2009
 Campeonato Carioca: 2009
Campeonato Brasileiro: 2009

Individual
 Campeonato Brasileiro Série A Team of the Year: 2007
 Campeonato Brasileiro Série A top goalscorer: 2007

References

External links

 
 
 

1980 births
Living people
Sportspeople from Rio Grande do Sul
Brazilian footballers
Brazilian expatriate footballers
Campeonato Brasileiro Série A players
Liga MX players
Esporte Clube Pelotas players
Grêmio Esportivo Brasil players
Esporte Clube Juventude players
Brasiliense Futebol Clube players
Paraná Clube players
CR Flamengo footballers
Atlético Clube Goianiense players
Paysandu Sport Club players
Macaé Esporte Futebol Clube players
Chiapas F.C. footballers
Expatriate footballers in the United Arab Emirates
Expatriate footballers in Mexico
Association football forwards